Ralph Dale Earnhardt (April 29, 1951February 18, 2001) was an American professional stock car driver and team owner, who raced from 1975 to 2001 in the former NASCAR Winston Cup Series (now called the NASCAR Cup Series), most notably driving the No.3 Chevrolet for Richard Childress Racing. His aggressive driving style earned him the nicknames "The Intimidator", "The Man in Black" and "Ironhead"; after his son Dale Earnhardt Jr. joined the Cup Series circuit in 1999, Earnhardt was generally known by the retronym Dale Earnhardt Sr. He is regarded as one of the greatest drivers in NASCAR history.

The third child of racing driver Ralph Earnhardt and Martha Earnhardt, he began his career in 1975 in the World 600. Earnhardt won a total of 76 Winston Cup races over the course of his 26-year career, including four Winston 500s (1990, 1994, 1999, and 2000) and the 1998 Daytona 500. Along with his 76 career points wins, he has also won 24 non-points exhibition events, bringing his overall Winston Cup win total to 100, one of only four drivers in NASCAR history to do so. He is the only driver in NASCAR history to score at least one win in four different and consecutive decades (scoring his first career win in 1979, 38 wins in the 1980s, 35 wins in the 1990s, & scoring his final two career wins in 2000). He also earned seven Winston Cup championships, a record held with Richard Petty and Jimmie Johnson.

On February 18, 2001, Earnhardt died in a sudden last-lap crash during the Daytona 500 due to a basilar skull fracture. His death was regarded in the racing industry as being a crucial moment in improving safety in all aspects of car racing, especially NASCAR. He was 49 years old. Earnhardt has been inducted into numerous halls of fame, including the NASCAR Hall of Fame inaugural class in 2010.

Biography

Early and personal life
Ralph Dale Earnhardt was born on April 29, 1951, in the Charlotte suburb of Kannapolis, North Carolina, as the third child of Martha ( Coleman, 1930–2021) and Ralph Earnhardt (1928-1973). Earnhardt's father was one of the best short-track drivers in North Carolina at the time and won his first and only NASCAR Sportsman Championship in 1956 at Greenville Pickens Speedway in Greenville, South Carolina. In 1963 at the age of 12, Dale Earnhardt secretly drove his father’s car in one of his races and had a near victory against one of his father's closest competitors. In 1972, he raced his father at Metrolina Speedway in a race with cars from semi mod and sportsman divisions. Although Ralph did not want his son to pursue a career as a race car driver, Dale dropped out of school to pursue his dreams. Ralph was a hard teacher for Dale, and after Ralph died of a heart attack at his home in 1973 at age 45, it took many years before Dale felt as though he had finally "proven" himself to his father. Earnhardt had four siblings: two brothers, Danny (died 2021) and Randy (died 2013); and two sisters, Cathy and Kaye. 

In 1968, at the age of 17, Earnhardt married his first wife, Latane Brown. With her, Earnhardt fathered his first son, Kerry, a year later. Earnhardt and Brown divorced in 1970. Earnhardt fathered son,Ralph Earnhardt.In 1967, In 1971, Earnhardt married his second wife, Brenda Gee, the daughter of NASCAR car builder Robert Gee. In his marriage with Gee, Earnhardt had two children: a daughter, Kelley King Earnhardt, in 1972, and a son, Dale Earnhardt Jr., in 1974. Not long after Dale Jr. was born, Earnhardt and Gee divorced. Earnhardt then married his third wife, Teresa Houston, in 1982. She gave birth to their daughter, Taylor Nicole Earnhardt, in 1988.

NASCAR career

Early Winston Cup career (1975–1978)
Earnhardt began his professional career in the NASCAR Winston Cup Series in 1975, making his points race debut at Charlotte Motor Speedway in North Carolina in the longest race on the Cup circuit—the 1975 World 600. He had made his Grand National debut in 1974 in an unofficial invitational exhibition race at Metrolina Speedway, where with eight laps to go he got under Richard Childress and spun out when battling for third. He drove the No. 8 Ed Negre Dodge Charger and finished 22nd in that race, just one spot ahead of his future car owner, Richard Childress. Earnhardt competed in eight more races until 1979.

Rod Osterlund Racing (1979–1980)
When he joined car owner Rod Osterlund Racing in a season that included a rookie class of future stars including Earnhardt, Harry Gant, and Terry Labonte in his rookie season, Earnhardt won one race at Bristol, captured four poles, scored eleven Top 5s and seventeen Top 10s, and finished seventh in the points standings despite missing four races due to a broken collarbone, winning Rookie of the Year honors.

During his sophomore season, Earnhardt, now with 20-year-old Doug Richert as his crew chief, began the season winning the Busch Clash. With wins at Atlanta, Bristol, Nashville, Martinsville, and Charlotte, Earnhardt won his first Winston Cup points championship. He is the only driver in NASCAR Winston Cup history to follow a Rookie of the Year title with a NASCAR Winston Cup Championship the next season. He was also the third driver in NASCAR history to win both the Rookie of the Year and Winston Cup Series championship, following David Pearson (1960, 1966) and Richard Petty (1959, 1964). Ten drivers have since joined this exclusive club: Rusty Wallace (1984, 1989), Alan Kulwicki (1986, 1992), Jeff Gordon (1993, 1995), Tony Stewart (1999, 2002), Matt Kenseth (2000, 2003), Kevin Harvick (2001, 2014), Kyle Busch (2005, 2015), Joey Logano (2009, 2018), Chase Elliott (2016, 2020), and Kyle Larson (2014, 2021).

Rod Osterlund Racing, Stacy Racing, and Richard Childress Racing (1981)
1981 would prove to be tumultuous for the defending Winston Cup champion. Sixteen races into the season, Rod Osterlund suddenly sold his team to Jim Stacy, an entrepreneur from Kentucky who entered NASCAR in 1977. After just four races, Earnhardt fell out with Stacy and left the team. Earnhardt finished out the year driving Pontiacs for Richard Childress Racing and managed to place seventh in the final points standings. Earnhardt departed RCR at the end of the season, citing a lack of chemistry.

Earnhardt was also a color commentator for the Busch Clash, while he also drove on that same day.

Bud Moore Engineering (1982–1983)
 
The following year, at Childress's suggestion, Earnhardt joined car owner Bud Moore for the 1982 and 1983 seasons driving the No. 15 Wrangler Jeans-sponsored Ford Thunderbird (the only full-time Ford ride in his career). During the 1982 season, Earnhardt struggled. Although he won at Darlington, he failed to finish 18 of the 30 races and ended the season 12th in points, the worst of his career. He also suffered a broken kneecap at Pocono Raceway when he flipped after contact with Tim Richmond. In 1983, Earnhardt rebounded and won his first of 12 Twin 125 Daytona 500 qualifying races. He won at Nashville and at Talladega, finishing 8th in the points standings, despite failing to finish 13 of the 30 races.

Return to Richard Childress Racing (1984–2001)

1984–1985
After the 1983 season, Earnhardt returned to Richard Childress Racing, replacing Ricky Rudd in the No. 3. Rudd went to Bud Moore's No. 15, replacing Earnhardt. Wrangler sponsored both drivers at their respective teams. During the 1984 and 1985 seasons, Earnhardt went to victory lane six times, at Talladega, Atlanta, Richmond, Bristol (twice), and Martinsville, where he finished fourth and eighth in the season standings respectively.

1986–1987
The 1986 season saw Earnhardt win his second career Winston Cup Championship and the first owner's championship for Richard Childress Racing. He won five races and had 16 top-fives and 23 top-10s. Earnhardt successfully defended his championship the following year, going to victory lane 11 times and winning the championship by 489 points over Bill Elliott. In the process, Earnhardt set a NASCAR modern-era record of four consecutive wins and won five of the first seven races. In the 1987 season, he earned the nickname "The Intimidator", due in part to the 1987 Winston All-Star Race. During this race, Earnhardt was briefly forced into the infield grass but kept control of his car and returned to the track without giving up his lead. The maneuver is now referred to as the "Pass in the Grass", even though Earnhardt did not pass anyone while he was off the track. After The Winston, an angry fan sent Bill France Jr. a letter threatening to kill Earnhardt at Pocono, Watkins Glen, or Dover, prompting the FBI to provide security for Earnhardt on the three tracks. The investigation was closed after the races at the three tracks finished without incident. Many of Earnhardt's competitors on the racetrack disliked his personal driving style. Earnhardt's relentless pursuit of victory on the racetrack combined with his uniquely offensive driving ability led to many rivalries with fellow drivers and fines levied by NASCAR. In 1987, NASCAR began to implement a measure that was designed to incentivize less aggressive driving styles by forcing drivers who cause these undesired hazardous racing conditions to be subjected to time at the garage region during the race.

1988–1989
The 1988 season saw Earnhardt racing with a new sponsor, GM Goodwrench, after Wrangler Jeans dropped its sponsorship in 1987. During this season, he changed the color of his paint scheme from blue and yellow to the signature black in which the No. 3 car was painted for the rest of his life. He won three races in 1988, finishing third in the points standings behind Bill Elliott in first and Rusty Wallace in second. The following year, Earnhardt won five races, but a late spin out at North Wilkesboro arguably cost him the 1989 championship, as Rusty Wallace edged him out for it by 12 points (Earnhardt won the final race, but Wallace finished 15th when needing to finish at least 18th to win). It was his first season for the GM Goodwrench Chevrolet Lumina.

1990–1995
The 1990 season started for Earnhardt with victories in the Busch Clash and his heat of the Gatorade Twin 125's. Near the end of the Daytona 500, he had a dominant forty-second lead when the final caution flag came out with a handful of laps to go. When the green flag waved, Earnhardt was leading Derrike Cope. On the final lap, Earnhardt ran over a piece of metal, which was later revealed as a bell housing, in turn 3, cutting down a tire. Cope, in an upset, won the race while Earnhardt finished fifth after leading 155 of the 200 laps. The No. 3 Goodwrench-sponsored Chevy team took the flat tire that cost them the win and hung it on the shop wall as a reminder of how close they had come to winning the Daytona 500. Earnhardt won nine races that season and won his fourth Winston Cup title, beating Mark Martin by 26 points. He also became the first multiple winner of the annual all-star race, The Winston. The 1991 season saw Earnhardt win his fifth Winston Cup championship. This season, he scored four wins and won the championship by 195 points over Ricky Rudd. One of his wins came at North Wilkesboro, in a race where Harry Gant had a chance to set a single-season record by winning his fifth consecutive race, breaking a record held by Earnhardt. Late in the race, Gant lost his brakes, which gave Earnhardt the chance he needed to make the pass for the win and maintain his record.

Earnhardt's only win of the 1992 season came at Charlotte, in the Coca-Cola 600, ending a 13-race win streak by Ford teams. Earnhardt finished a career-low 12th in the points for the second time in his career, with three last place finishes (Daytona and Talladega in July and Martinsville in September), and the only time he had finished that low since joining Richard Childress Racing. He still made the trip to the annual Awards Banquet with Rusty Wallace but did not have the best seat in the house. Wallace stated he and Earnhardt had to sit on the backs of their chairs to see, and Earnhardt said, "This sucks, I should have gone hunting." At the end of the year, longtime crew chief Kirk Shelmerdine left to become a driver. Andy Petree took over as crew chief. Hiring Petree turned out to be beneficial, as Earnhardt returned to the front in 1993. He once again came close to a win at the Daytona 500 and dominated Speedweeks before finishing second to Dale Jarrett on a last-lap pass. Earnhardt scored six wins en route to his sixth Winston Cup title, including wins in the first prime-time Coca-Cola 600 and The Winston, both at Charlotte, and the Pepsi 400 at Daytona. He beat Rusty Wallace for the championship by 80 points. On November 14, 1993, after the season-ending Hooters 500 at Atlanta, the race winner Wallace and 1993 series champion Earnhardt ran a dual Polish Victory Lap together while carrying #28 and #7 flags commemorating 1992 Daytona 500 winner Davey Allison and 1992 NASCAR Winston Cup Series champion Alan Kulwicki respectively, who both had died in separate plane accidents during the season.

In 1994, Earnhardt achieved a feat that he himself had believed to be impossible—he scored his seventh Winston Cup championship, tying Richard Petty. He was very consistent, scoring four wins, and after Ernie Irvan was sidelined due to a near-deadly crash at Michigan (the two were neck-and-neck at the top of the points up until the crash), won the title by over 400 points over Mark Martin. Earnhardt sealed the deal at Rockingham by winning the race over Rick Mast. It was his final NASCAR championship and his final season for the GM Goodwrench Chevrolet Lumina. Earnhardt started off the 1995 season by finishing second in the Daytona 500 to Sterling Marlin. He won five races in 1995, including his first road course victory at Sears Point. He also won the Brickyard 400 at Indianapolis Motor Speedway, a win he called the biggest of his career. But in the end, Earnhardt lost the championship to Jeff Gordon by 34 points. The GM Goodwrench racing team changed to Chevrolet Monte Carlos.

Earnhardt almost was ready to leave the #3 at the end of the 1995 season, according to his former crew chief Larry McReynolds. At the time, McReynolds was the crew chief for the #28 Havoline Ford Thunderbird at Robert Yates Racing. Earnhardt had actually been approached by Yates to drive the #28 for the 1995 season in place of Ernie Irvan, who was injured in a crash during the 1994 season. Instead, Robert Yates signed Dale Jarrett to a one-year deal to drive the #28. During the 1995 season, Yates was being pressed by his manufacturer to start a second team and sent a contract to Earnhardt to drive it. Earnhardt never returned the contract, and according to McReynolds the reason he did not sign was because he only wanted to drive the #28 for Yates; the team fully intended to put Irvan back behind the wheel of his old car once he was able to resume driving. Instead, Earnhardt stayed with RCR and the #3, while Jarrett was signed to drive Yates’ new car, numbered 88.

1996–1999

1996 for Earnhardt started just like it had done in 1993—he dominated Speedweeks, only to finish second in the Daytona 500 to Dale Jarrett for the second time. He won early in the year, scoring consecutive victories at Rockingham and Atlanta. On July 28 in the DieHard 500 at Talladega, he was second in points and looking for his eighth season title, despite the departure of crew chief Andy Petree. Late in the race, Ernie Irvan lost control of his No. 28 Havoline-sponsored Ford Thunderbird, made contact with the No. 4 Kodak-sponsored Chevy Monte Carlo of Sterling Marlin, and ignited a crash that saw Earnhardt's No. 3 Chevrolet hit the tri-oval wall nearly head-on at almost 200 mph. After hitting the wall, Earnhardt's car flipped and slid across the track, in front of race traffic. His car was hit in the roof and windshield. This accident, as well as a similar accident that led to the death of Russell Phillips at Charlotte, led NASCAR to mandate the "Earnhardt Bar", a metal brace located in the center of the windshield that reinforces the roof in case of a similar crash. This bar is also required in NASCAR-owned United SportsCar Racing and its predecessors for road racing.

Rain delays had canceled the live telecast of the race, and most fans first learned of the accident during the night's sports newscasts. Video of the crash showed what appeared to be a fatal incident, but once medical workers arrived at the car, Earnhardt climbed out and waved to the crowd, refusing to be loaded onto a stretcher despite a broken collarbone, sternum, and shoulder blade. Although the incident looked like it would end his season early, Earnhardt refused to stay out of the car. The next week at Indianapolis, he started the race but exited the car on the first pit stop, allowing Mike Skinner to take the wheel. When asked, Earnhardt said that vacating the No. 3 car was the hardest thing he had ever done. The following weekend at Watkins Glen, he drove the No. 3 Goodwrench Chevrolet to the fastest time in qualifying, earning the "True Grit" pole. T-shirts emblazoned with Earnhardt's face were quickly printed up, brandishing the caption, "It Hurt So Good". Earnhardt led for most of the race and looked to have victory in hand, but fatigue took its toll and he ended up sixth behind race winner Geoff Bodine. Earnhardt did not win again in 1996 but still finished fourth in the standings behind Terry Labonte, Jeff Gordon, and Dale Jarrett, with 2 wins, 13 top fives, 17 top tens, and his last 2 career poles, with an average finish of 10.6. David Smith departed as crew chief of the No. 3 team and RCR at the end of the year for personal reasons, and he was replaced by Larry McReynolds.

In 1997, Earnhardt went winless for only the second time in his career. The only (non-points) win came during Speedweeks at Daytona in the Twin 125-mile qualifying race, his record eighth-straight win in the event. Once again in the hunt for the Daytona 500 with 10 laps to go, Earnhardt was taken out of contention by a late crash which sent his car upside down on the backstretch. He hit the low point of his year when he blacked out early in the Mountain Dew Southern 500 at Darlington in September, causing him to hit the wall. Afterward, he was disoriented, and it took several laps before he could find his pit stall. When asked, Earnhardt complained of double vision which made it difficult to pit. Mike Dillon (Richard Childress's son-in-law) was brought in to relieve Earnhardt for the remainder of the race. Earnhardt was evaluated at a local hospital and cleared to race the next week, but the cause of the blackout and double vision was never determined. Despite no wins, Earnhardt finished the season fifth in the final standings with 7 top fives and 16 top tens, with an average finish of 12.1.

On February 15, 1998, Earnhardt finally won the Daytona 500 in his 20th attempt after failing to win in his previous 19 attempts. He began the season by winning his Twin 125-mile qualifier race for the ninth straight year, and the week before was the first to drive around the track under the newly installed lights, for coincidentally 20 laps. On race day, he showed himself to be a contender early. Halfway through the race, however, it seemed that Jeff Gordon had the upper hand. But by lap 138, Earnhardt had taken the lead and thanks to a push by teammate Mike Skinner, he maintained it. Earnhardt made it to the caution-checkered flag before Bobby Labonte. Afterwards, there was a large show of respect for Earnhardt, in which every crew member of every team lined pit road to shake his hand as he made his way to victory lane. Earnhardt then drove his No. 3 into the infield grass, starting a trend of post-race celebrations. He spun the car twice, throwing grass and leaving tire tracks in the shape of a No. 3 in the grass. He then spoke about the victory, saying, "I have had a lot of great fans and people behind me all through the years and I just can't thank them enough. The Daytona 500 is ours. We won it, we won it, we won it!" The rest of the season did not go as well, and the Daytona 500 was his only victory that year. Despite that, he did almost pull off a Daytona sweep, where he was one of the contenders for the win in the first nighttime Pepsi 400, but a pit stop late in the race in which a rogue tire cost him the race win. He slipped to 12th in the point standings halfway through the season, and Richard Childress decided to make a crew chief change, taking Mike Skinner's crew chief Kevin Hamlin and putting him with Earnhardt while giving Skinner Larry McReynolds (Earnhardt's crew chief). Earnhardt finished the 1998 season eighth in the final points standings, with 1 win, 5 top fives, and 13 top tens, with an average finish of 16.2.

Before the 1999 season, fans began discussing Earnhardt's age and speculating that with his son, Dale Jr., making his Winston Cup debut, Earnhardt might be contemplating retirement. Earnhardt swept both races for the year at Talladega, leading some to conclude that his talent had become limited to the restrictor plate tracks, which require a unique skill set and an exceptionally powerful racecar to win. But halfway through the year, Earnhardt began to show some of the old spark. In the August race at Michigan, he led laps late in the race and nearly pulled off his first win on a non-restrictor-plate track since 1996. One week later, he provided NASCAR with one of its most controversial moments. At the Bristol night race, Earnhardt found himself in contention to win his first short track race since Martinsville in 1995. When a caution came out with 15 laps to go, leader Terry Labonte got hit from behind by the lapped car of Darrell Waltrip. His spin put Earnhardt in the lead with five cars between him and Labonte with five laps to go. Labonte had four fresh tires, and Earnhardt was driving on old tires, which made Earnhardt's car considerably slower. Labonte caught Earnhardt and passed him coming to the white flag, but Earnhardt drove hard into turn two, bumping Labonte and spinning him around. Earnhardt collected the win while spectators booed and made obscene gestures. "I didn't mean to turn him around, I just wanted to rattle his cage," Earnhardt said of the incident. He finished seventh in the standings that year, with 3 wins, 7 top fives, and 21 top tens, with an average finish of 12.0.

2000

In the 2000 season, Earnhardt had a resurgence, which was commonly attributed to neck surgery he underwent to correct a lingering injury from his 1996 Talladega crash. He scored what were considered the two most exciting wins of the year—winning by 0.010 seconds over Bobby Labonte at Atlanta, then gaining seventeen positions in the final four laps to win at Talladega, claiming his only No Bull million-dollar bonus along with his record 10th win at the track. Earnhardt also had second-place runs at Richmond and Martinsville, tracks where he had struggled through the late 1990s. On the strength of those performances, Earnhardt got to second in the standings. However, poor performances at the road course of Watkins Glen, where he wrecked coming out of the chicane, a wreck with Kenny Irwin Jr. while leading the spring race at Bristol, and mid-pack runs at intermediate tracks like Charlotte and Dover in a season dominated by the Ford Taurus in those tracks from Roush, Yates, and Penske, coupled with Bobby Labonte's extreme consistency, denied Earnhardt an eighth championship title. Earnhardt finished 2000 with two wins, 13 top fives, 24 top tens, an average finish of 9.4, and was the only driver besides Labonte to finish the season with zero DNF's.

Death

During the Daytona 500 at Daytona International Speedway on February 18, 2001, Earnhardt was killed in a three-car crash on the final lap of the race. He collided with Ken Schrader after making small contact with Sterling Marlin and hit the outside wall head-on. He had been blocking Schrader on the outside and Marlin on the inside at the time of the crash. Earnhardt's and Schrader's cars both slid off the track's asphalt banking into the infield grass just inside of turn 4. Seconds later, his driver Michael Waltrip won the race, with Michael’s teammate and his son Dale Earnhardt Jr. finishing second. Earnhardt was pronounced dead at the Halifax Medical Center at 5:16 PM Eastern Standard Time (22:16 UTC); he was 49 years old. NASCAR president Mike Helton confirmed Earnhardt's death in a statement to the press. An autopsy conducted on February 19, 2001, concluded that Earnhardt sustained a fatal basilar skull fracture. Four days later, on February 22, public funeral services for Earnhardt were held at the Calvary Church in Charlotte, North Carolina.

Aftermath 
After Earnhardt's death, two investigations led by the Daytona Beach Police Department and NASCAR commenced; nearly every detail of the crash was made public. The allegations of seatbelt failure resulted in Bill Simpson's resignation from the company bearing his name, which manufactured the seatbelts used in Earnhardt's car and nearly every other NASCAR driver's car. NASCAR implemented rigorous safety improvements, such as mandating the HANS device, which Earnhardt refused to wear after finding it restrictive and uncomfortable. Several press conferences were held in the days following Earnhardt's death. After driver Sterling Marlin and his relatives received hate mail and death threats from angry fans, Waltrip and Earnhardt Jr. absolved him of any responsibility. Richard Childress made a public pledge that the number 3 would never again adorn the side of a black race car with a GM Goodwrench sponsorship. The number returned for the 2014 season, this time not sponsored by GM Goodwrench (which was rebranded GM Certified Service in 2011), driven by Childress's grandson Austin Dillon.

At this time, his team was re-christened as the No. 29 team. Childress's second-year Busch Series driver Kevin Harvick was named as Earnhardt's replacement, beginning with the 2001 Dura Lube 400 at North Carolina Speedway. Special pennants bearing the No. 3 were distributed to everyone at the track to honor Earnhardt, and the Childress team wore blank uniforms out of respect, something which disappeared quickly and was soon replaced by the previous GM Goodwrench Service Plus uniforms. Harvick's car always displayed the Earnhardt stylized number 3 on the "B" posts (metal portion on each side of the car to the rear of the front windows) above the number 29 until the end of 2013, when he departed for Stewart-Haas Racing.

Fans began honoring Earnhardt by holding three fingers aloft on the third lap of every race, a black screen of No. 3 in the beginning of NASCAR Thunder 2002 before the EA Sports logo, and the television coverage of NASCAR on Fox and NASCAR on NBC went silent for each third lap from Rockingham to the following year's race there in honor of Earnhardt, unless on-track incidents brought out the caution flag on the third lap. Three weeks after Earnhardt's death, Harvick, driving a car that had been prepared for Earnhardt, scored his first career Cup win at Atlanta. On the final lap of the 2001 Cracker Barrel Old Country Store 500, he beat Jeff Gordon by .006 seconds (the margin being 0.004 of a second closer than Earnhardt had won over Bobby Labonte at the same race a year ago) in an identical photo finish, and the images of Earnhardt's longtime gas man Danny "Chocolate" Myers crying after the victory, Harvick's tire-smoking burnout on the frontstretch with three fingers held aloft outside the driver's window. The win was also considered cathartic for a sport whose epicenter had been ripped away. Harvick would win another race at the inaugural event at Chicagoland en route to a ninth-place finish in the final points, and won Rookie of the Year honors along with the 2001 NASCAR Busch Series Championship.

Dale Earnhardt, Inc. won five races in the 2001 season, beginning with Steve Park's victory in the race at Rockingham just one week after Earnhardt's death. Earnhardt Jr. and Waltrip finished first and second in the series' return to Daytona in July for the Pepsi 400, a reverse of the finish in the Daytona 500. Earnhardt Jr. also won the fall races at Dover (first post 9/11 race) and Talladega and came to an eighth-place points finish.

Earnhardt's remains were interred at his estate in Mooresville, North Carolina after a private funeral service on February 21, 2001.

No. 3 car

Earnhardt drove the No. 3 car for the majority of his career, spanning the latter half of the 1981 season, and then again from 1984 until his death in 2001. Although he had other sponsors during his career, his No. 3 is associated in fans' minds with his last sponsor GM Goodwrench and his last color scheme — a predominantly black car with bold red and silver trim. The black and red No. 3 continues to be one of the most famous logos in North American motor racing.

A common misconception was that Richard Childress Racing "owned the rights" to the No. 3 in NASCAR competition (fueled by the fact that Kevin Harvick's car had a little No. 3 as an homage to Earnhardt from 2001 to 2013 and the usage of the No. 3 on the Camping World Truck Series truck of Ty Dillon when he ran in that series), but in fact NASCAR, and no specific team, owns the rights to this or any other number. According to established NASCAR procedures, Richard Childress Racing had priority over other teams if they chose to reuse the number, which they did when Austin Dillon was promoted to the Cup series in 2014. While Richard Childress Racing owns the stylized No. 3 logos used during Earnhardt's lifetime (and used presently with Dillon), those rights would hypothetically not prevent a future racing team from using a different No. 3 design (also, a new No. 3 team would most likely, in any case, need to create logos which fit with their sponsor's logos).

In 2004, ESPN released a made-for-TV movie entitled 3: The Dale Earnhardt Story, which used a new (but similarly colored) No. 3 logo. The movie was a sympathetic portrayal of Earnhardt's life, but the producers were sued for using the No. 3 logo. In December 2006, the ESPN lawsuit was settled, but details were not released to the public.

Dale Earnhardt Jr. made two special appearances in 2002 in a No. 3 Busch Series car: these appearances were at the track where his father died (Daytona) and the track where he made his first Winston Cup start (Charlotte). Earnhardt Jr. won the first of those two races, which was the season-opening event at Daytona. He also raced a No. 3 sponsored by Wrangler on July 2, 2010, for Richard Childress Racing at Daytona. In a green-white-checker finish he outran Joey Logano to win his second race in the No. 3.

Otherwise, the No. 3 was missing from the national touring series until September 5, 2009, when Austin Dillon, the 19-year-old grandson of Richard Childress, debuted an RCR-owned No. 3 truck in the Camping World Truck Series. Dillon and his younger brother Ty Dillon drove the No. 3 in various lower level competitions for several years, including the Camping World East Series. In 2012, Austin Dillon began driving in the Nationwide Series full-time, using the No. 3; he had previously used the No. 33 while driving in that series part-time.

Richard Childress Racing entered a No. 3 in the Daytona truck race on February 13, 2010, with a sponsorship from Bass Pro Shops driven by Austin Dillon. It was involved in a wreck almost identical to that which took the life of Earnhardt: being spun out, colliding with another vehicle, and being turned into the outside wall in turn number four. He walked away unscathed. Dillon again returned to a No. 3 marked racecar when he started fifth in the 2012 Daytona Nationwide Series opener in an Advocare sponsored black Chevrolet Impala. On December 11, 2013, RCR announced that Austin Dillon would drive the No. 3 car in the upcoming 2014 Sprint Cup season, bringing the number back to the series for the first time in 13 years.

Only the former International Race of Champions actually retired the No. 3, which they did in a rule change effective in 2004. Until the series folded in 2007, anyone wishing to use the No. 3 again had to use No. 03 instead.

Formula One driver Daniel Ricciardo chose the number 3 as his permanent racing number when F1's rules changed to allow drivers to choose their own numbers for 2014 and stated on Twitter that part of the reason for his choice was that he was a fan of Earnhardt's, while his helmet design features the number stylized in the same way.

Legacy
"Earnhardt Tower", a seating section at Daytona International Speedway was opened and named in his honor a month before his death at the track.

Earnhardt has several roads named after him, including a street in his hometown Kannapolis. Dale Earnhardt Boulevard (originally Earnhardt Road) is marked as exit 60 off Interstate 85, northeast of Charlotte. Dale Earnhardt Drive is also the start of The Dale Journey Trail, a self-guided driving tour of landmarks in the lives of Earnhardt and his family. The North Carolina Department of Transportation switched the designation of a road between Kannapolis and Mooresville near the headquarters of DEI (that used to be called NC 136) with NC 3, which was in Currituck County. In addition, exit 72 off Interstate 35W, one of the entrances to Texas Motor Speedway, is named "Dale Earnhardt Way".

Between the 2004 and 2005 JGTC (renamed Super GT from 2005) season, Hasemi Sport competed in the series with a sole black G'Zox-sponsored Nissan 350Z with the same number and letterset as Earnhardt on the roof.

During the NASCAR weekend races at Talladega Superspeedway on April 29, 2006 – May 1, 2006, the DEI cars competed in identical special black paint schemes on Dale Earnhardt Day, which is held annually on his birthday—April 29. Martin Truex Jr., won the Aaron's 312 in the black car, painted to reflect Earnhardt's Intimidating Black No. 3 NASCAR Busch Grand National series car. In the Nextel Cup race on May 1, No. 8 Dale Earnhardt Jr.; No. 1 Martin Truex Jr.; and No. 15 Paul Menard competed in cars with the same type of paint scheme.

On June 18, 2006, at Michigan for the 3M Performance 400, Earnhardt Jr. ran a special vintage Budweiser car to honor his father and his grandfather Ralph Earnhardt. He finished third after rain caused the race to be cut short. The car was painted to resemble Ralph's 1956 dirt cars, and carried 1956-era Budweiser logos to complete the throwback look.

In the summer of 2007, Dale Earnhardt, Inc. (DEI) with the Dale Earnhardt Foundation, announced it will fund an annual undergraduate scholarship at Clemson University in Clemson, South Carolina, for students interested in motorsports and automotive engineering. Scholarship winners are also eligible to work at DEI in internships. The first winner was William Bostic, a senior at Clemson majoring in mechanical engineering.

In 2008, on the 50th anniversary of the first Daytona 500 race, DEI and RCR teamed up to make a special COT sporting Earnhardt's 1998 Daytona 500 paint scheme to honor the tenth anniversary of his Daytona 500 victory. In a tribute to all previous Daytona 500 winners, the winning drivers appeared in a lineup on stage, in chronological order. The throwback No. 3 car stood in the infield, in the approximate position Earnhardt would have taken in the processional. The throwback car featured the authentic 1998-era design on a current-era car, a concept similar to modern throwback jerseys in other sports. The car was later sold in 1:64 and 1:24 scale models.

The Intimidator 305 roller coaster has been open since April 2, 2010, at Kings Dominion in Doswell, Virginia. Named after Earnhardt, the ride's trains are modeled after his black-and-red Chevrolet.
 Another Intimidator was built at Carowinds, in Charlotte, North Carolina, which opened on March 27, 2010. The entrance to both roller coasters feature signage that shows Earnhardt's legacy along with one of his cars.

Atlanta Braves assistant coach Ned Yost was a friend of Earnhardt, and Richard Childress. When Yost was named Milwaukee Brewers manager, he changed jersey numbers, from No. 5 to No. 3 in Earnhardt's honor. (No. 3 is retired by the Braves in honor of outfielder Dale Murphy, so Yost could not make the change while in Atlanta.) When Yost was named Kansas City Royals assistant coach, he wore No. 2 for the 2010 season, even when he was named manager in May 2010, but for the 2011 season, he switched back to No. 3.

During the third lap of the 2011 Daytona 500 (a decade since Earnhardt's death), and 2021 Daytona 500 (two decades since Earnhardt's death) the commentators on FOX fell silent while fans raised three fingers in a similar fashion to the tributes throughout 2001.

The north entrance to New Avondale City Center in Arizona will bear the name Dale Earnhardt Drive. Avondale is where Earnhardt won a Cup race in 1990.

His helmet from the 1998 season is at the National Museum of American History in the Smithsonian museum in Washington D.C.

Weedeater, a sludge metal band from North Carolina, paid tribute to Earnhardt on their 2003 album Sixteen Tons, with the song "No. 3". The song is played with audio clips from television broadcasts about Earnhardt mixed in the background. He is also mentioned in a 2001 song composed by John Hiatt entitled The Tiki Bar Is Open, along with his legendary race number.

On February 28, 2016, after winning the Folds of Honor QuikTrip 500 at Atlanta Motor Speedway, during his victory lap, driver Jimmie Johnson held his hand out of his window, with three fingers extended in tribute to Earnhardt. This was following Johnson's 76th Cup Series win, which tied the career mark of Earnhardt's. This is also the track where Earnhardt claimed his sixth Winston Cup Series title.

In the week of the 2021 Formula One United States Grand Prix, McLaren driver, Daniel Ricciardo drove the iconic Wrangler car from the 1980s as a tribute to Earnhardt and his family, as Ricciardo has been a fan of Earnhardt since he was a child. The opportunity came after winning the Italian Grand Prix that year, and the McLaren Team Owner, Zak Brown promised him that he would give him a chance to drive the iconic car.

Awards

 He was awarded the Order of the Long Leaf Pine by North Carolina Governor Jim Hunt in 1994.
 He was inducted into the North Carolina Sports Hall of Fame in 1994.
 Earnhardt was named one of NASCAR's 50 Greatest Drivers in 1998.
 Earnhardt was posthumously named "NASCAR's Most Popular Driver" in 2001. This was the only time he received the award.
 He was posthumously inducted into the Motorsports Hall of Fame of America in 2002, a year after his death.
 He was posthumously inducted in the Oceanside Rotary Club Stock Car Racing Hall of Fame at Daytona Beach in 2004.
 He was posthumously inducted in the International Motorsports Hall of Fame in 2006.
 Earnhardt was named first on ESPN's list of "NASCAR's 20 Greatest Drivers" in 2007 in front of Richard Petty. 
 He was posthumously inducted into the Automotive Hall of Fame in 2006.
 He was posthumously inducted in the Inaugural Class of the NASCAR Hall of Fame on May 23, 2010.
 He was posthumously inducted into the Indianapolis Motor Speedway Hall of Fame in 2020.

Motorsports career results

NASCAR
(key) (Bold – Pole position awarded by qualifying time. Italics – Pole position earned by points standings or practice time. * – Most laps led.)

Winston Cup Series

Daytona 500

Busch Series

Winston West Series

Busch North Series

International Race of Champions
(key) (Bold – Pole position. * – Most laps led.)

ARCA Hooters SuperCar Series
(key) (Bold – Pole position awarded by qualifying time. Italics – Pole position earned by points standings or practice time. * – Most laps led.)

24 Hours of Daytona
(key)

See also

 Dale Earnhardt, Inc.
 Ralph Earnhardt, father
 Teresa Earnhardt, wife
 Dale Earnhardt Jr., son
 Kelly Earnhardt Miller, daughter
 Jeffrey Earnhardt, grandson
 Kerry Earnhardt, son 
 Bobby Earnhardt, grandson 
 Richard Childress Racing
 List of Daytona 500 winners
 List of Daytona 500 pole position winners
 List of NASCAR Sprint Cup Series champions
 List of all-time NASCAR Cup Series winners
 List of members of the NASCAR Hall of Fame

References

External links 

 
 

 
24 Hours of Daytona drivers
1951 births
2001 deaths
Accidental deaths in Florida 
American people of German descent
American Speed Association drivers
Burials in North Carolina
Dale Earnhardt Inc. drivers
Dale Sr
Filmed deaths in motorsport
Filmed deaths in the United States
International Motorsports Hall of Fame inductees
International Race of Champions drivers
NASCAR Cup Series champions
NASCAR drivers
NASCAR Hall of Fame inductees
NASCAR team owners
People from Kannapolis, North Carolina
Racing drivers from Charlotte, North Carolina
Racing drivers from North Carolina
Racing drivers who died while racing
Richard Childress Racing drivers
Rolex Sports Car Series drivers
Sports deaths in Florida